Gschwend is a town in the German state of Baden-Württemberg, in Ostalbkreis district.

Notable people
Philipp Gottlieb Osiander (1803–1876), born in Frickenhofen, Oberamtmann and Member of Landtag
Friedrich von Schmidt (1825–1891), born in Frickenhofen, architect of many churches and town halls in new-gothic style
Christian Dietrich (1844–1919), Swabian old-pietist
Peter Jakob Schober (1897–1983), painter
Lina Haag (1907–2012) resistance fighter 
Erich Schneider (born 1933), politician (CDU), President of Landtag Baden-Württemberg from  1982 till 1992
 Theodore Frederic Molt (1795–1856), organist and composer in Canada, was born here

References

Ostalbkreis